Julius von Kennel (10 June 1854 – 24 January 1939) was a German zoologist and entomologist born in Schwegenheim.

He studied at the University of Würzburg, where he came under the influence of zoologist Karl Semper (1832-1893). Later, he worked as an assistant to Karl August Möbius (1825-1908) at the University of Kiel, and following his habilitation, he returned to the University of Würzburg. In 1882-83 he participated on a research expedition to Trinidad and Venezuela (including the Orinoco River region). Later, he served as a lecturer at the Forstakademie in Aschaffenburg, and from 1887 to 1915, was a full professor of zoology at the University of Dorpat.

Kennel was an authority on Microlepidoptera, and in particular the family- Tortricidae (tortrix moths). In 1898-99 he was president of the Estonian Naturalists' Society, and in 1922 became director of the zoological museum in Riga.

Written works 
 1883: Biologische und faunistische Notizen aus Trinidad. 28 pp. - Biological and faunistic notes from Trinidad.
 1887: Über Theilung und Knospung der Thiere. 60 pp.
 1891: Die Verwandtschaftsverhältnisse der Arthropoden, K. F. Koehler. 48 pp. - Relationships of arthropods.
 1893: Lehrbuch der Zoologie. Stuttgart: Ferdinand Enke. 678 pp. - Textbook of zoology.
 1896: Studien über sexuellen Dimorphismus: Variation und verwandte Erscheinungen. Druck von C. Mattiesen. 64 pp. - Studies of sexual dimorphism: variation and related phenomena.
 1921, The Palaearktischen Tortriciden, eine monographische Darstellung. Stuttgart: E. Schweizerbart'sche Verlagsbuchhandlung. 742 pp. - Palaearctic Tortricidae, a monograph.pdf at Zobodat
 1923, Ueber Ctenodrilus Pardalis Clap, Ein Beitr. Zur Kenntniss Der Anatomie Und Knospung Der Anneliden, Neuauflage BiblioBazaar, 2010.

References 

 This article is based on an equivalent article at the German Wikipedia, namely:
 Eggers, F.: 1939, (Kennel, J.). Zool. Anz. 125(9/10): p. 272.
 Eggers, F.: 1942, (Kennel, J.). Korrespondenzbl. Naturf. Ver. Riga, 64: p. 13 - 14.
 Escherich, K.: 1943, In Memoriam Julius von Kennel. Z. angew. Ent., 30: p. 148 - 151.
 Sachtleben, H.: 1939, (Kennel, J. von). Arb. morph. taxon. Ent. Berlin-Dahlem, 6(2): p. 188.
 Strand, E.: 1940, (Kennel, J.). Folia Zoologica et Hydrobiologica, 10: p. 364 - 368.
 Groll, E. K. (ed.): 2006, Entomologen der Welt (Biographien, Sammlungsverbleib). Datenbank 2. Version, DEI im ZALF e. V.: Kennel, Julius von: (Internet).

German taxonomists
 01
1854 births
1939 deaths
German lepidopterists
Academic staff of the University of Kiel
Academic staff of the University of Tartu
University of Würzburg alumni
Academic staff of the University of Würzburg
People from Germersheim (district)
People from the Palatinate (region)
19th-century German zoologists
20th-century German zoologists